The sixteenth election to Glamorgan County Council, south Wales, took place in March 1937. It was preceded by the 1934 election and followed, due to the Second World War by the 1946 election.

Overview
Labour's comfortable majority on the council, including the aldermanic bench, remained unchanged.

Boundary changes
There were no boundary changes at this election.

Candidates
Many candidates  were returned unopposed.

Contested elections
Labour contested almost every seat on the council, with a significant proportion of candidates returned unopposed.

Of the eleven aldermen retiring at the end of their sixth year term, the ten Labour aldermen all sought re-election while Rev D.H. Williams (Ind) stood down from the Council after over thirty years. Alderman Dorothy Rees (Lab), who was elected for three years to fill a vacancy in 1934, also sought re-election.

Outcome
Labour retained their majority, losing two seats but gaining three.

Results

Aberaman

Aberavon

Abercynon

Aberdare Town

Bargoed

Barry 
Dudley Howe had previously represented Cadoxton and gained the neighbouring Barry ward from Labour. However, Labour won Cadoxton for the first time against the new candidate.

Barry Dock

Blaengwawr

Bridgend

Briton Ferry

Cadoxton

Caerphilly

Cilfynydd

Coedffranc

Cowbridge

Cwm Aber

Cwmavon

Cymmer

Dinas Powys

Dulais Valley

Ferndale

Gadlys

Garw Valley

Glyncorrwg

Gower

Hengoed

Hopkinstown

Kibbor

Castell Coch

Llandeilo Talybont

Llanfabon

Llwydcoed

Llwynypia

Loughor

Maesteg, Caerau and Nantyffyllon

Maesteg, East and West

Mountain Ash
The sitting member, the Hon. John Bruce (Ind) stood down and Labour gained the seat without a contest.

Neath (North)

Neath (South)

Newcastle

Ogmore Valley

Penarth North

Penarth South

Pencoed

Penrhiwceiber

Pentre

Pontardawe

Pontyclun

Port Talbot East

Port Talbot West

Porthcawl

Pontlottyn

Pontypridd Town

Penygraig

Porth

Swansea Valley

Tonyrefail and Gilfach Goch

Trealaw

Treforest

Treherbert

Treorchy

Tylorstown

Vale of Neath

Ynyshir

Ystalyfera

Ystrad

Election of Aldermen
In addition to the 66 councillors the council consisted of 22 county aldermen. Aldermen were elected by the council, and served a six-year term. Following the 1937 election, there were eleven Aldermanic vacancies, and the retiring aldermen were all re-elected.

The following retiring aldermen were re-elected:
William Bowen (Lab, Llanfabon)
David Daniel Davies (Lab, Pontardawe)
Rose Davies (Lab, Aberaman)
John Evans (Lab, Maesteg)
Johnson Dicks (Lab, Abercynon)
E.H. Fleming (Lab, Hopkinstown)
William Jenkins (Lab, Glyncorrwg)
Caradoc Jones (Lab, Llandeilo Talybont)
David Lewis (Lab, Tylorstown)
Dorothy Rees (Lab, Barry Dock)
John Thomas (Lab, Port Talbot)

By-elections
Eleven vacancies were caused by the election of aldermen.

Aberaman by-election

Abercynon by-election

Barry Dock by-election
Labour lost the by-election held following the re-election of Dorothy Rees to the aldermanic bench. The Labour candidate had been elected following Rees's original election as alderman three years previously and at the recent election had unsuccessfully contested the neighbouring Barry ward.

Glyncorrwg by-election

Hopkinstown by-election

Llandeilo Talybont by-election

Llanfabon by-election

Maesteg by-election

Pontardawe by-election

Port Talbot by-election
Joe Brown, former agent to Ramsay Macdonald when he was MP for Abervaron, failed to gain the Labour nomination and ran as an Independent.

Tylorstown by-election

References

Bibliography

1937
1937 Welsh local elections
1930s in Glamorgan